The New York Times Upfront is a news magazine for high school students, published by Scholastic Inc. in partnership with The New York Times. The magazine and its website feature journalism from the Times, as well as material produced by Upfront’s editorial staff.

Edited with a high school audience in mind, Upfront covers a wide array of topics of interest to teenagers, explaining how news events relate to them, their communities, and their futures.

The magazine and its accompanying resources, including videos and skills activities, are designed to teach students how to think critically, form their own opinions and become informed and engaged citizens. Upfront is also intended to boost students' non-fiction reading skills. It brings current events into the classroom while connecting with high school curricula by meeting rigorous national and state standards in social studies and English/Language Arts.

Although Upfront is targeted at a high school audience, some teachers also use it for a younger, gifted audience. More than 15,000 Social Studies and English/Language Arts teachers nationwide subscribe to Upfront for their students.

Published 13 times during the school year, Upfront has a circulation of approximately 453,000, with a readership of over 1.3 million students—since teachers generally use the magazine with more than one class and often share it with other teachers (the pass along rate is estimated at 3).

Each issue comes with a teacher's edition that includes in-depth lesson plans, quizzes and skills activities. Upfront’s website offers videos, additional skills sheets, text sets (editor-curated collections focusing on key social studies topics or skills) and an interactive world atlas and almanac. In addition, every feature article published in print is also available online in two different Lexile levels.

History
The New York Times Upfront was first published in 1999, but it arguably has roots dating back to Scholastic's earliest days. The company's first high school magazine was called The Western Pennsylvania Scholastic and it evolved and changed names over the decades, becoming Scholastic Senior and Update.

In 1999, Scholastic partnered with The New York Times, and Update became The New York Times Upfront. The idea was to combine the journalistic resources of the Times and the reporting from its news bureaus around the world with Scholastic's ability to create magazines that meet the curricular needs of high school teachers. Upfront is also a way to introduce the Times brand and its journalism to a new generation of readers, complementing the Times website and its other education efforts.

Magazine sections
Every issue of Upfront covers both domestic and international news. The topics frequently covered in the magazine are:

 Civics & U.S. Government 
 U.S. History 
 Constitution & The Law 
 Elections 
 Media Literacy 
 Immigration 
 Race & Identity 
 Gender 
 Environment & Science 
 Economics 
 China 
 Russia 
 India 
 Teen Issues 
 Energy & Climate Change

Awards and recognition
According to press releases, The New York Times Upfront has been recognized multiple times for excellence by the Association of Educational Publishers.

References

External links
 The New York Times Official Website
 Scholastic Inc. Homepage
 The New York Times Homepage
 The New York Times Learning Network

Biweekly magazines published in the United States
Education magazines
The New York Times
Magazines established in 1999
Scholastic Corporation
Magazines published in New York City
1999 establishments in New York City